Flight Lieutenant Alexander N Robin L Appleford (1921-2012) was one of the youngest fighter pilots who flew with the Royal Air Force during the Battle of Britain, and was one of the aircrew known as "The Few".

Appleford was born in September 1921. He was educated at King's College, Taunton. After joining the RAF, he was posted on 13 May 1940 to No. 66 Squadron RAF at RAF Duxford, flying Spitfires.

On 4 September 1940 Appleford was shot down over the Thames Estuary during a dogfight with a Bf 109, but baled out slightly wounded.

Following the Battle of Britain, Appleford was a flying instructor. In 1943 he returned to combat duties with No. 274 Squadron RAF flying Hurricanes on coastal defence in North Africa. After a spell with the Aircraft Delivery Unit, he went to South Africa as a flying instructor.

Appleford died on 17 April 2012 in Henley-on-Thames.

References 

1921 births
The Few
2012 deaths
People educated at King's College, Taunton
Royal Air Force officers
Royal Air Force pilots of World War II